Legion Condor is a 1939 German war film directed by Karl Ritter and starring Paul Hartmann, Albert Hehn and Fritz Kampers. The film portrays the German Condor Legion, which fought in the Spanish Civil War. Because of the German-Soviet Pact, the production was halted after 15 days of shooting, on 25 August 1939 to avoid offending the Soviets, who had supported the other side in Spain and were negatively portrayed in the film. Karl Ritter's diary entry that day stated that Hermann Göring had called the Ufa studio to tell him to abort the film.

The film is often confused with the full-length documentary film by Karl Ritter, Im Kampf Gegen den Weltfeind (In the Battle against World Enemy #1), released on 15 June 1939 on the same subject. Legion Condor was planned as a sequel to Ritter's highly successful 1938 feature film, Pour le Merite, also starring Paul Hartmann, Albert Hehn, Fritz Kampers, Carsta Löck, amongst others.

In August 2018 the long-lost Ufa film script was found in a used bookstore in Berlin. No copy of the script is found in any German film archive or institution. A monograph on the film has been published by William Gillespie, titled Legion Condor – Karl Ritter's lost 1939 feature film.

Cast
 Paul Hartmann as Kommandant der Jagdflieger
 Albert Hehn as Jagdflieger
 Fritz Kampers as Oberfeldwebel Moebius
 Josef Dahmen as Unteroffizier
 Willi Rose as Unteroffizier
 Otto Graf
 Karl John
 Wolfgang Staudte
 Heinz Welzel
 Herbert A.E. Bohme
 Carsta Löck
 Marina von Ditmar
 Ernst Bader
 Dima Detoor
 Andrews Engelmann
 Irene Fischer
 Friedrich Gnaß
 Lutz Götz
 Malte Jäger
 Karl Klüsner
 Franz Kossak
 Lothar Körner
 Lea Niako
 Ruth Nimbach
 Lili Schoenborn-Anspach
 Ursula Ulrich
 Ernst von Klipstein

References

Bibliography

External links 
 

1939 films
German war films
1939 war films
1930s German-language films
Films directed by Karl Ritter
Films set in Spain
Films of Nazi Germany
German black-and-white films
UFA GmbH films
1930s German films